Ellen 'Linnea' Petrea Henriksson (born 9 November 1986) is a Swedish singer and songwriter who participated in Idol 2010 in which she placed fourth. , she is also the lead singer of the jazz band Prylf. In 2012 Henriksson released her first music album, which she co-wrote and co-produced with singer Orup. During mid-2013 Henriksson toured Sweden with the band Gyllene Tider.

Early life
Henriksson was born in Halmstad, Sweden. Her public debut occurred in 1995 when she participated in the TV4 televised singing show Småstjärnorna. She studied music at Skurups folkhögskola, and in 2007 she met other singers and musicians, started the jazz band Prylf and became the band's lead singer. In 2010 Prylf released their only, music album, which is called Kind of Green.

2010–present: Idol 2010 and Gyllene Tider

From August to December 2010, Henriksson participated in the singing competition Idol 2010, which was broadcast on TV4. She finished in fourth place and later that year she signed a record deal with Sony Music and Epic. During her time on Idol she was among the final twelve contestants during a qualification week and was voted into the Top 12 along with singer Geir Rönning during the broadcast. Henriksson was one of the least-popular two contestants during her time on Idol 2010; she had to sing-off with Elin Blom and retained her place in the competition by attracting more public votes than Blom.

In 2011, Henriksson released her first solo music single "Väldigt kär/Obegripligt ensam", which she co-wrote and co-produced with Orup. Parts of Henriksson's first solo music album Till mina älskade och älskare, which was released on 30 May 2012, were also co-written with Orup. During mid-2012 Henriksson went on a summer tour around Sweden; later that year she embarked upon an extended music tour to several Swedish cities.

On 19 January 2013, Henriksson was voted "Artist of the Year 2012" by listeners to Swedish radio station P3:s for its yearly P3 Gold gala, receiving the most votes. From June to August 2013 Henriksson joined the music tour of the band Gyllene Tider, which toured around Sweden, as their opening act. In late July 2013, Henriksson became the first live act to perform at the new Tele2 Arena in Stockholm; she was the opening act for Gyllene Tider. Henriksson's songs have been included on several music compilation albums.

Henriksson's song "Enastående" was included in the soundtrack to the Swedish movie Once Upon a Time in Phuket. She collaborated with the Swedish DJ Avicii in his song "Hope There's Someone", which is included in his debut album True. On 8 December 2014, Henriksson was one of the hosts of Musikhjälpen 2014. In 2018, she appears on Så mycket bättre which is broadcast on TV4.

On 3 September 2019, Henriksson was announced as a presenter of Melodifestivalen 2020 along with Lina Hedlund and David Sundin.

Linnea Henriksson was going to be the commentator for Eurovision Song Contest 2022 for Swedish TV but announced on 10 May that she had tested positive for COVID-19 and would not be a commentator for the semi-finals. Her co-commentator Edward af Sillén would comment the semi-final alone in Torino, then both Sillen and Henriksson would comment the final from a SVT studio in Stockholm.

Discography

Albums

EPs

Singles

Notes

References

External links
Official website

Singers from Halmstad
Songwriters from Halmstad
English-language singers from Sweden
Swedish-language singers
Idol (Swedish TV series) participants
1986 births
Living people
Swedish songwriters
21st-century Swedish singers
21st-century Swedish women singers